is a former Japanese football player.

He has previously played for Shimizu S-Pulse, Nagoya Grampus, Yokohama F. Marinos and the Japan national team. He is a left-footed play-making midfielder.

Playing career

Early years

Fujimoto was educated at and played for Toko Gakuen High School, during which time he was also a member of the U-17 Japanese National Team for the 2001 FIFA U-17 World Championship hosted by Trinidad and Tobago. Fujimoto played three games in the competition but the team was eliminated after the group stage.

After graduating high school Fujimoto received an offer from J2 League side Kawasaki Frontale, but he decided to continue his study and play football at the University of Tsukuba. He was a member of the national team for the 2005 Universiade held at İzmir, Turkey. Fujimoto was the top scorer with six goals and was selected as the MVP of the competition.

Club

Upon graduating university Fujimoto joined Shimizu S-Pulse in 2006 and inherited jersey number 10 from Masaaki Sawanobori. During his first full professional season Fujimoto played in 28 league games and scored 8 goals. He was awarded the J-League Young Player of the Year Award. He was seriously injured in late season of 2008 and made a comeback goal against Kyoto Sanga FC via direct free kick on 19 August 2009.

Fujimoto left Shizuoka in 2011 and moved west to join defending J.League champions Nagoya Grampus. He spent 3 seasons with Nagoya and scored 14 goals in 94 games as they finished 2nd, 7th and 10th in the league between 2011 and 2013.

2014 saw him join Yokohama F. Marinos where, now in his 30s, he found his playing time slightly curtailed, scoring 3 goals in 26 games in his first year and then playing only 19 times in his final year in Japan's second largest city, once again finding the back of the net 3 times.

He signed for Gamba Osaka ahead of the 2016 season and in his first 3 years at the club he was never able to establish himself as a first-team regular for any sustained period of time.   He made just 13 league appearances in his first season with the men in blue and black, 14 the following year, before at the age of 34 playing 21 out of Gamba's 34 league games to help them to 9th in the final league standings.

On August 21, 2020 - after some months without football -, he signed to join SC Sagamihara.

On 27 December 2022, Fujimoto announcement retirement from football after 16 years career as professional with club.

National team

He made his Japanese National Team debut on 24 March 2007 in a 2-0 friendly victory at home to Peru. Fujimoto came on as a substitute in the 85th minute to replace his high school fellow alumnus Shunsuke Nakamura. His next international involvement came when he made brief second-half appearances in both matches in Japan's double header in June of that year, the 2-0 win over Montenegro and the 0-0 draw with Colombia.   He played once more in 2007 as a 73rd minute replacement in the 4-1 home routing of Egypt.

It would be almost 3 years before he next pulled in the blue of Japan in their September 2010 home friendly wins over Paraguay and Guatemala, he was once again a substitute in both games.

Following his transfer from S-Pulse to Nagoya Grampus he was named in Japan's squad for their victorious 2011 AFC Asian Cup campaign.   He came on as a substitute in the final minute of their draw with Jordan in the group stage before earning his first international start in the final of the competition against Australia, a match Japan won 1-0 after extra time.

It would be another 9 months before his next international involvement and he again made the starting line up and this time played his first full 90 minutes for Japan in a 1-0 friendly win at home to Vietnam on 7 October 2011, before playing the final 13 minutes of an 8-0 world cup qualifying victory over Tajikistan 4 days later.

2012 would be his final year to earn international caps.   He started and scored his sole international goal in a 3-1 win over Iceland in a home friendly on 24 February before again starting in the surprise 1-0 world cup qualifying defeat to Uzbekistan 5 days later.   His last appearance for the Samurai Blue came in a 1-1 draw in a friendly at home to Venezuela on 15 August where he played the final 16 minutes.

Club statistics
As of the end 2022 season

 1 - includes Japanese Super Cup appearances.

Reserves performance

National team statistics
Last Update: 8 February 2019

Trivia
His father Koju was also a footballer who played for Nippon Kokan of the Japan Soccer League, the former top-flight league in Japan.

Honors and awards

Individual honors
 J. League Rookie of the Year – 2006
 J. League Best Eleven – 2010, 2011

International honors
 AFC Asian Cup - 2011

References

External links
 
 
 
 
 Japan National Football Team Database

1984 births
Living people
University of Tsukuba alumni
People from Yamato, Kanagawa
Association football people from Kanagawa Prefecture
Japanese footballers
Japan youth international footballers
Japan international footballers
J1 League players
J2 League players
J3 League players
Shimizu S-Pulse players
Nagoya Grampus players
Yokohama F. Marinos players
Gamba Osaka players
Gamba Osaka U-23 players
Kyoto Sanga　FC players
SC Sagamihara players
2011 AFC Asian Cup players
AFC Asian Cup-winning players
Association football midfielders